James MacKerras Macdonnell,  (December 15, 1884 – July 27, 1973) was a Canadian lawyer and parliamentarian.

Biography

He was born in Kingston, Ontario, the son of George W. Macdonnell and Mary Louise Philips, he was a Master at St. Andrew's College from 1904 to 1914 before becoming a trust company officer. He enlisted with the Canadian Expeditionary Force on September 24, 1914 at Valcartier, Quebec.  He was awarded an MC in the 1917 Birthday Honours.

Career
Macdonnell was first elected to the House of Commons of Canada as a Progressive Conservative Party candidate in the 1945 federal election representing Muskoka—Ontario riding. He was defeated in the 1949 federal election, but returned to parliament later that year when he won a by-election held in the Toronto riding of Greenwood.

Following the 1957 federal election that returned the first Progressive Conservative government and the first Tory government since the Great Depression, the new Prime Minister of Canada, John Diefenbaker, named Macdonnell to Cabinet as a minister without portfolio. He resigned from Cabinet on August 8, 1959 for health reasons and was defeated in the 1962 federal election by Andrew Brewin of the New Democratic Party.

Macdonnell was appointed a Companion of the Order of Canada in 1967 for "services as a parliamentarian".

References

External links
 

1884 births
1973 deaths
Companions of the Order of Canada
Members of the House of Commons of Canada from Ontario
Members of the King's Privy Council for Canada
Progressive Conservative Party of Canada MPs
Canadian Expeditionary Force officers
Canadian military personnel of World War I
Canadian Army officers
Canadian recipients of the Military Cross
People from Kingston, Ontario